Ryafan was an American-bred, British-trained thoroughbred racehorse.

Background
She was sired by Lear Fan, an American stallion who raced in Europe, winning the Prix Jacques le Marois in 1984. His other progeny included Good Ba Ba and Sikeston.

Racing career
She won a number of prestigious races, including the Falmouth Stakes and the Nassau Stakes in England, the Prix Marcel Boussac in France, and the Queen Elizabeth II Challenge Cup Stakes and the Yellow Ribbon Stakes in the United States of America.

Breeding record
Ryafan produced at least three foals

Volcanic, a bay colt, foaled in 1999, sired by Zafonic
Pressure Group, bay colt, 2000, by Sadler's Wells
Phantom Wind, bay filly, 2001, by Storm Cat

References

1994 racehorse births
Thoroughbred family 4-r
Racehorses bred in Kentucky
Racehorses trained in the United Kingdom